Flying Officer  Lloyd Allan Trigg VC DFC (5 May 1914 or 5 June 1914 – 11 August 1943), of Houhora, New Zealand, was a pilot in the RNZAF during World War II. He was a posthumous recipient of the Victoria Cross, the highest award for gallantry in the face of the enemy for British and Commonwealth armed forces, and received the award for pressing home an attack on a German U-boat in August 1943. He was killed in the action. His award is unique, as it was awarded on evidence solely provided by the enemy, for an action in which there were no surviving Allied witnesses to corroborate his gallantry.

Early life
Lloyd Allan Trigg, the son of Arthur and Cecelia Louisa Trigg (née White), was born at Houhora, Northland, New Zealand on 5 May 1914, or 5 June 1914, and was educated at Whangarei Boys' High School, where he served in the school cadet force. He later studied at Auckland University College and then took up farming in the Victoria Valley, as well as  serving as a non commissioned officer in the part-time North Auckland Rifles prior to World War II.

Military career
Trigg joined the Royal New Zealand Air Force (RNZAF) as a trainee pilot on 15 June 1941. On enlistment, his occupation was recorded as "machinery salesman" and he was married with two sons, having married Nola McGarvey in 1938.  After completing basic training at the RNZAF base at Levin, Trigg attended pilot training school at No. 3 EFS in Canada. Noted for his hard work and willingness to learn, he was recommended for a commission. He obtained his pilot's wings on 16 January 1942, and was commissioned as a pilot officer. After converting onto the Lockheed Hudson and completing further training at a reconnaissance school, Trigg was promoted to flying officer and embarked for the UK in October 1942, to join Coastal Command.

He was posted to West Africa in November 1942 and joined 200 Squadron RAF in January 1943. As a first pilot he took part in over 46 operational reconnaissance patrols, convoy escort flights and anti-submarine patrols. Having previously operated Hudsons, the squadron later converted to the maritime version of the B-24 Liberator.  He was an experienced pilot (he had already been awarded the Distinguished Flying Cross) having been involved in two attacks against U-boats in February 1943.

He was flying his first operational flight in a Liberator V over the Atlantic from his base at Yundumn, West Africa (now Banjul, The Gambia), when on 11 August 1943 he engaged the  under the command of Oberleutnant Klemens Schamong. His aircraft received several catastrophic hits from the submarine's anti-aircraft guns during its approach to the submarine and was on fire as Trigg made his final attack.

After dropping its depth charges, Trigg's Liberator crashed 300 yards behind its victim, killing Trigg and his crew. The only witnesses to Trigg's actions were the U-boat crew members. The badly damaged U-boat sank soon after the attack but a small group of survivors (including Schamong) were spotted by an RAF Short Sunderland of No. 204 Squadron in the dinghy of the crashed Liberator, drifting off the coast of West Africa. On 2 November 1943, Trigg was awarded the Victoria Cross for his actions.

The Victoria Cross was presented to Trigg's widow, Nola, by the Governor General of New Zealand, Sir Cyril Newall, on 28 May 1944. At his wife's request, the presentation took place at the Trigg family home so that family and friends could be present. It was the last Victoria Cross to be won by a New Zealander; the Victoria Cross for New Zealand, established in 1999, is now the highest gallantry award that can be bestowed on a New Zealand serviceman.

Since Trigg has no burial place, he is commemorated on the Malta Memorial to the 2,298 Commonwealth aircrew who lost their lives around the Mediterranean during the Second World War and who have no known grave.

Citation
The citation reads as follows:

Legacy

In 2007, New Zealand researcher Arthur Arculus tracked down Klemens Schamong near Kiel. The commander said of Trigg's effort "such a gallant fighter as Trigg would have been decorated in Germany with the highest medal or order".

In May 1998, Trigg's VC was sold at auction by Spinks of London for £120,000, the equal highest price ever realised for a VC at that time. The seller was not believed to have been a relative of Trigg and the medals were purchased on behalf of the Michael Ashcroft Trust, the holding institution for Lord Ashcroft's VC Collection. The VC is now on display at the Lord Ashcroft Gallery at the Imperial War Museum.

Trigg Avenue, Rotorua is named in his honour.

Trigg's complete medal awards are:
Victoria Cross
Distinguished Flying Cross
1939–45 Star
Atlantic Star
Defence Medal
War Medal 1939–1945
New Zealand War Service Medal

See also
 Sergeant Thomas Frank Durrant VC (1918-1942), whose award was supported by a recommendation from Kapitänleutnant F. K. Paul after the St Nazaire raid
 Lieutenant-Commander Gerard Broadmead Roope VC (1905–1940), whose award was supported by a recommendation and evidence from Kapitan zur See Hellmuth Heye, commander of the Admiral Hipper.

References

Bibliography

External links
New Zealand Electronic Text Centre – a more detailed report of the action.

Lloyd Trigg in a listing of New Zealanders who have won the VC - with a picture of his medals.
Burial location of Lloyd Trigg "Aircraft crashed into the sea, no known grave".
News item" Lloyd Trigg's Victoria Cross sold at auction".
NZPA release "U-boat captain who shot down NZ VC-winner found".

1914 births
1943 deaths
New Zealand military personnel
Royal New Zealand Air Force personnel
New Zealand World War II recipients of the Victoria Cross
New Zealand military personnel killed in World War II
Recipients of the Distinguished Flying Cross (United Kingdom)
New Zealand World War II pilots
People from the Northland Region
People educated at Whangarei Boys' High School